She's Back on Broadway is a 1953 musical comedy-drama film in WarnerColor. It is Virginia Mayo's last musical film. Her singing voice was dubbed by Bonnie Lou Williams. The film was Mayo's unofficial follow-up to her 1952 musical hit She's Working Her Way Through College.

Plot
When Catherine Terris's (Virginia Mayo) career in Hollywood hits the skids, she heads back to the site of her first great triumphs...Broadway! She takes the lead in a play which is being directed by Rick Sommers (Steve Cochran), the man who was both her Svengali and her lover. Sommers is still bitter that she walked out on him to become the toast of Hollywood years earlier. Can Terris and Sommers put aside their mutual animosity long enough to make a go of this production? After the way things start off, it doesn't seem likely.

Cast

 Virginia Mayo as Catherine Terris
 Gene Nelson as Gordon Evans
 Frank Lovejoy as John Webber
 Steve Cochran as Rick Sommers
 Patrice Wymore as Karen Keene
 Virginia Gibson as Angela Korinna
 Larry Keating as Mitchell Parks
 Paul Picerni as Jud Kellogg
 Nedrick Young as Rafferty
 Jacqueline deWit as Lisa Kramer
 Steve Condos as Specialty Dancer (as Condos) 
 Jerry Brandow as Specialty Dancer (as Brandow) 
 Douglas Spencer as Lew Ludlow 
 Mabel Albertson as Velma Trumbull 
 Lenny Sherman as Ernest Tandy 
 Cliff Ferre as Lyn Humphries 
 Ray Kyle as Mickey Zealand 
 Sy Milano as Baritone Singer

Musical numbers
1) Overture/I'll Take You/Behind the Mask - Played by Orchestra
2) I May Be Wrong - Sung by Gene Nelson
3) I'll Take You - Sung and Danced by Virginia Mayo (dubbed by Bonnie Lou Williams) and Gene Nelson
4) One Step Ahead - Sung and Danced by Patrice Wymore, Steve Condos and Jerry Brandow
5) Break the Ties That Bind You - Sung by Virginia Mayo (dubbed by Bonnie Lou Williams)
6) Breakfast in Bed - Sung and Danced by Virginia Mayo (dubbed by Bonnie Lou Williams) and Chorus
7) Mardi Gras - Sung by Sy Milano and Chorus, then Danced by Patrice Wymore and Chorus
7.1) Behind the Mask - Sung by Sy Milano, then Danced by Virginia Mayo and Chorus
7.2) Mardi Gras (reprise) - Danced by Gene Nelson
7.3) Behind the Mask (reprise) - Sung by Chorus, Danced by Virginia Mayo, Gene Nelson and Chorus
8) I'll Take You (reprise) - Sung and Danced by Virginia Mayo (dubbed by Bonnie Lou Williams), Gene Nelson and Chorus

References

External links
 
 
 
 

1950s romantic musical films
1950s romantic comedy-drama films
1950s musical comedy-drama films
American romantic comedy-drama films
American romantic musical films
American musical comedy-drama films
Films directed by Gordon Douglas
Films scored by David Buttolph
1953 comedy films
1953 films
1953 drama films
1950s English-language films
1950s American films